Saurosuchus (meaning "lizard crocodile") is an extinct genus of large loricatan pseudosuchian archosaur that lived in South America during the Late Triassic period. It was a heavy, ground-dwelling, quadrupedal carnivore, likely being the apex predator in the Ischigualasto Formation.

Discovery and naming

The holotype, PVL 206, was discovered by Galileo J. Scaglia and Leocadio Soria in 1957, lying in a greenish sandstone on the Cancha de Bochas Member of the Ischigualasto Formation in the Ischigualasto-Villa Unión Basin in northwestern Argentina. It consists of a nearly complete, but deformed skull. Saurosuchus was formally described and named later in 1959 by Osvaldo. A. Reig. The specific name, galilei, is in honour to Galileo J. Scaglia, who unearthed and prepared the holotype.

Referred specimens
Saurosuchus is known from numerous specimens coming from the Ischigualasto Formation. Apart from the holotype, it was identified another individual: specimen PVL 2198; consisting of a partial maxilla, left ilium, right and left ischium, eleven dorsal vertebrae, osteoderms, ribs and teeth. Sill referred additional specimens, PVL 2557, 2472 and 2267. The specimen PVL 2557 consists of two dorsal vertebrae, right and left sacrals, nine caudal vertebrae, right ilium, ischium and partial pubis, right femur, tibia, fibula, tarsus and pes, ribs and chevrons. PVL 2472 compromises one cervical vertebra, tibia and astragalus. Lastly, PVL 2267 is composed by a fragmented ilium, femur, tibia, fibula, a tarsus and a partial pes.
In 2010, during the redescription of the skull of Saurosuchus, Alcober referred and described the immature specimen PVSJ 32; consisting of a complete skull, complete cervical and dorsal vertebral series, four anterior caudal vertebrae, ribs and two dorsal osteoderm rows. The postcranial remains of this specimen, were properly described by Trotteyn et al. 2011.

Here, more specimens of Saurosuchus were referred: PVSJ 369, 675 and 615. In addition to this, the previous specimens PVL 2472 and PVL 2267 were excluded, both of them being not referable to Saurosuchus.

Saurosuchus was also reported from the Chinle Formation of Arizona in 2002 on the basis of isolated teeth and small skull fragments. The diagnostic value of these bones has been questioned in later studies, which considered them to be from an indeterminate species of rauisuchian.

Description

This would make it one of the largest "Rauisuchian", after the enormous Fasolasuchus. There are two rows to either side of the midline, with each leaf-shaped osteoderm joining tightly with the ones in front of and behind it. It has a deep, laterally compressed skull. The teeth are large, recurved, and serrated. The skull is wide at its back and narrows in front of the eyes. The skull roof and maxilla are somewhat pitted.

Pitting is also seen in aquatic phytosaurs and crocodilians, but the ridges and grooves are deeper and much more extensive across the skulls of these forms. The frontal bones, located at the top of the skull, are enlarged to form thick ridges over the eyes. As in more evolved rauisuchians, a small rod projects down from the lacrimal bone in front of the eye, but it does not attach firmly to the jugal bone below it. Ridges along the upper surface of the supraoccipital bone at the back of the skull are attachment points for strong neck ligaments. The cervical vertebrae are shortened and robust, forming a strong neck.

Classification
Saurosuchus was considered a member of the Rauisuchia, although now it is considered part of the more basal Loricata, a clade comprising both Rauisuchia  and the true crocodylians. Below is the cladogram of the Loricata conducted by Nesbitt 2011:

Paleoecology

Saurosuchus was unearthed in the Cancha de Bochas Member from the Ischigualasto Formation, being the major predator on its environment. The Ischigualasto Formation was dominated by fluvial and floodplain environments with strongly seasonal rainfalls. Interlayered volcanic ash layers above the base and below the top of the formation provide chronostratigraphic control and have yielded ages of 231.4 ± 0.3 Ma and 227 ± 0.9 Ma respectively.

Contemporaneous fauna
Animals that lived alongside included numerous non-dinosaurian tetrapods, as well as basal dinosauromorphs. Notable paleofauna that were contemporaneous with Saurosuchus in the Cancha de Bochas Member include: Hyperodapedon, Exaeretodon, Herrerasaurus, Sillosuchus, Eoraptor, Trialestes, Aetosauroides and Ischigualastia. Herrerasaurus with Saurosuchus, are some of the most common predators in the formation, with numerous specimens and remains.

See also
 Rauisuchia
 1959 in paleontology
 Pseudosuchia
 Crurotarsi

References

External links

 Saurosuchus galilei at DigiMorph
 Saurosuchus at Paleofile.com (archived copy)
 ICS 2018 Timescale

Paracrocodylomorphs
Late Triassic pseudosuchians
Carnian genera
Late Triassic reptiles of South America
Triassic Argentina
Fossils of Argentina
Ischigualasto Formation
Fossil taxa described in 1959
Prehistoric pseudosuchian genera